This is an incomplete list of advocates of utilitarianism and/or consequentialism.

Deceased

Ancient
Epicurus
Lucretius
Mozi

17th century
Richard Cumberland
John Gay
Bernard Mandeville

18th century

19th century

20th century

Living

References

 
Utilitarians
Utilitarians